Othman II was the emperor of Kanem-Bornu Empire from 1369 to 1371.

Rulers of the Kanem Empire
14th-century monarchs in Africa
Year of birth unknown
Year of death unknown